The Quai François Mitterrand is a quay by the River Seine in Paris, France, along the stretch where the Palais du Louvre is situated. Formerly Quai du Louvre, it was renamed Quai François Mitterrand after the former French president on October 26, 2003.

References

External links 
 Quai du Louvre painting by Claude Monet
 Quai du Louvre photograph

Francois Mitterrand
Buildings and structures in the 1st arrondissement of Paris
Art gallery districts
Louvre Palace
River Seine
François Mitterrand